Beyond the City (1892) is a novel by the Scottish author Sir Arthur Conan Doyle.

External links

1892 British novels
Novels by Arthur Conan Doyle